Dr. Volkmar Denner (born 30 November 1956 in Uhingen) is a German business executive who was the CEO of Robert Bosch GmbH from 2012 July  to 2021 December.

Education
Denner graduated with a doctorate in physics from the University of Stuttgart.

Career
Denner has spent his whole career with Bosch. In 2012, when he was head of research and engineering, beat out auto parts chief Bernd Bohr to replace incumbent Franz Fehrenbach in a move that made him only the seventh CEO since Bosch was founded in 1886.

During the Hannover Messe in April 2016, Denner was among the 15 German CEOs who were invited to a private dinner with President Barack Obama.

Other activities
 Baden-Badener Unternehmer-Gespräche (BBUG), Member of the Board
 Deutscher Zukunftspreis, Member of the Board of Trustees
 German Association of the Automotive Industry (VDA), Member of the Managing Board

References

1956 births
Living people
German chief executives
Robert Bosch GmbH
University of Stuttgart alumni